Daviesia epiphyllum, commonly known as staghorn bush, is a species of flowering plant in the family Fabaceae and is endemic to the south-west of Western Australia. It is a rigid, erect, spreading, glabrous shrub with flattened, staghorn-shaped phylloclades with sharply-pointed lobes, and yellowish-red flowers.

Description

Taxonomy and naming
Daviesia epiphyllum was first formally described in 1855 by Carl Meissner in Botanische Zeitung from specimens collected by James Drummond. The specific epithet (epiphyllum) means "upon a leaf", referring to the flowers growing from the phylloclades.

Distribution and habitat
Staghorn bush grows on sandplains in heathland between Bullsbrook, Eneabba and Moora  in the Avon Wheatbelt, Geraldton Sandplains and Swan Coastal Plain biogeographic regions of south-western Western Australia.

Conservation status
Daviesia epiphyllum is classified as "not threatened" by the Western Australian Government Department of Biodiversity, Conservation and Attractions.

References

epiphyllum
Eudicots of Western Australia
Plants described in 1855
Taxa named by Carl Meissner